Christian Maes (2 October 1947 – 21 March 2021) was a Belgian sailor. He competed in the Flying Dutchman event at the 1968 Summer Olympics.

References

External links
 

1947 births
2021 deaths
Belgian male sailors (sport)
Olympic sailors of Belgium
Sailors at the 1968 Summer Olympics – Flying Dutchman
Sportspeople from Ghent